James "Jaysen" Bryhan (born 13 February 1978) is a British television  actor, best known for his role as Lance Cooper in the British film The Apostate: Call of the revenant and The Archivist in Shadow and Bone.

Career
James Bryhan began his career as an actor in  2014, playing the lead  part of Lance Cooper in the British horror thriller, The Apostate: Call of the revenant alongside British actress Terri Dwyer. In 2015, Bryhan portrayed the older Albert Einstein alongside Guy Henry  detailing his life.  Since September 2015 Bryhan was rumored to play the role of Ramirez, made famous by Sean Connery in the upcoming reboot of Highlander, directed by Cedric Nicolas-Troyan.
James won the award for Best Actor in a supporting role for the short film , Shame my name at The Midlands Movie Awards 2020 hosted by Michael Sales and BBC host, Ed Stagg.
Bluff (2022) - Collins

Shadow and Bone (TV series) (2019) – Archivist

References

External links
 
Official Twitter

British male television actors
British male film actors
Living people
1970 births